István Liptay (10 August 1935 – 18 August 2022) was an Hungarian basketball player. He competed in the men's tournament at the 1960 Summer Olympics.

Liptay died on 18 August 2022, at the age of 87.

References

External links

1935 births
2022 deaths
Hungarian men's basketball players
Olympic basketball players of Hungary
Basketball players at the 1960 Summer Olympics
Sportspeople from Szeged